The Sam Marshall House is a historic house in rural Searcy County, Arkansas.  It is located southeast of Morning Star, on the west side of County Road 163.  It is a single-story log structure, rectangular in plan, with a roof whose front gable extends over a porch supported by square columns.  The logs were apparently hand-hewn, and joined by dovetailed notches.  Built in 1929, it is one of the latest examples of log construction in the county.

The house was listed on the National Register of Historic Places in 1993.

See also
National Register of Historic Places listings in Searcy County, Arkansas

References

Houses on the National Register of Historic Places in Arkansas
Houses completed in 1929
Houses in Searcy County, Arkansas
National Register of Historic Places in Searcy County, Arkansas